The 1882 Harvard Crimson football team represented Harvard University in the 1882 college football season. They finished with an 8–1 record.

Schedule

References

Harvard
Harvard Crimson football seasons
Harvard Crimson football